Anna Pic (born 4 June 1978) is a French politician from the Socialist Party (NUPES) who has been the member of the National Assembly for Manche's 4th constituency since 2022.

See also 

 List of deputies of the 16th National Assembly of France

References 

1978 births
Living people
People from Montpellier
Socialist Party (France) politicians
Women members of the National Assembly (France)
Deputies of the 16th National Assembly of the French Fifth Republic
21st-century French women politicians
21st-century French politicians
People from Cherbourg-Octeville
Members of Parliament for Manche